Tim-Henry Handwerker (born 19 May 1998) is a German professional footballer who plays as a left-back for 2. Bundesliga club 1. FC Nürnberg.

Career
Handwerker joined 1. FC Nürnberg in July 2019 from 1. FC Köln, having spent a season on loan at FC Groningen.

References

External links
 
 
 

1998 births
Living people
German footballers
Germany youth international footballers
Germany under-21 international footballers
Association football defenders
Bundesliga players
2. Bundesliga players
Regionalliga players
Eredivisie players
1. FC Köln II players
1. FC Köln players
FC Groningen players
1. FC Nürnberg players
German expatriate footballers
German expatriate sportspeople in the Netherlands
Expatriate footballers in the Netherlands
Footballers from North Rhine-Westphalia